Baimao could refer to the following locations in China:

 Baimao, Wuwei County (白茆镇), town in Wuwei County, Anhui
 Baimao, Yuexi County, Anhui (白帽镇), town
 Baimao, Linshu County (白旄镇), town in Linshu County, Shandong